Lasiognatha mormopa is a moth of the family Tortricidae first described by Edward Meyrick in 1906. It is found in India, Sri Lanka, Borneo and the Philippines.

Larval host plants are Syzygium jambos and Syzygium polyanthum.

References

Moths of Asia
Moths described in 1906